Alessandro Cannataro (born 20 April 1995 in Italy) is an Italian footballer.

References

Italian footballers
Living people
Association football midfielders
1995 births
Aurora Pro Patria 1919 players
CD Gerena players